Malesherbia densiflora is a perennial herb native to the Andean foothills in Atacama Chile. M. densiflora can grow up to 40 cm tall and has white racemose flowers. 

It is estimated that the genera evolved around 5.6 million years ago.

References 

Malesherbia